Glorianna Davenport is a New York-born media maker.  A co-founder of the MIT Media Lab, Davenport directed the Interactive cinema research group from 1987–2004 and the Media Fabrics research group from 2004-2008. Davenport retired from the Massachusetts Institute of Technology in the Summer of 2008. From 2008 to the present, she has managed the transition of Tidmarsh Farms, a former 610 acre cranberry farm in Plymouth Massachusetts, into conservation and wetland restoration. In 2011, Davenport founded Living Observatory, a non-profit, learning collaborative that focuses on documenting and sharing the long term story of wetland restoration of former cranberry farms. In this work, Davenport returned as a visiting scientist at the MIT Media Lab where she works closely with the Responsive Environments Group.

Biography
A graduate of Mount Holyoke College in 1966, Davenport made documentary films in New York and Maine before becoming a lecturer at M.I.T's Film Section directed by cinema verite pioneer Richard Leacock in 1977.

In 1985, Davenport along with Richard Leacock facilitated the transition of M.I.T.s Film/Video Section into the Weisner Building as part of the new MIT Media Lab. With the retirement of Leacock in 1987, Davenport joined the faculty and founded the Interactive cinema group. At the time she wrote: "Interactive cinema reflects the longing of cinema to become something new, something more complex, something more intimate, as if in conversation with an audience."

In these years before the web, the challenge was to envision a computational form that was scalable and that bound compelling content with human interaction.  Davenport writes: "As cinema frees itself from the constraints of the inherently linear celluloid base, a new meta-cinema explodes the myth of the heroic by projecting itself into our everyday environments. The creation and sharing of cinema can happen anywhere, any time. As an improvisational learning partner, meta-cinema invites us to articulate new hypotheses, to sensorially augment our dialogs, to share multi-point of view stories, and to engage in sociable interchange between all people."

In 2008, Davenport retired from the MIT Media Lab in order to transition Tidmarsh Farms, a 610 acre cranberry farm into restoration and conservation.  From 2010-2016, she collaborated with over 22 partners on the Tidmarsh Farms Restoration Project, the largest freshwater, wetland restoration in Massachusetts. In 2011, she founded Living Observatory, a non-profit learning collaborative of scientists, engineers, artists and restoration specialists; the mission of Living Observatory is to tell the long term story of the wetland restoration of cranberry farmland, to advance science and the enhance public understanding of fresh water wetlands.

Projects
In 1979-81, Davenport, working with cinematographer Richard Leacock, filmed and edited "Remembering Niels Bohr: 1885-1962".

In 1982-1987, Davenport produced, co-filmed, edited and designed an interactive delivery system for her documentary "New Orleans in Transition: 1983-1986". Conceived of as an in-depth cinematic case study of urban change before during and after the 1984 Louisiana World Exposition, the interactive video disc version of the film as delivered on a Project Athena workstation in 1987 invited students to view the movie based on a particular story thread or character and allowed students to edit material from the film and place it into their written papers.

As her thinking about the form developed, Davenport designed "Workshop in Elastic Movie Time", a collaborative workshop in which students were asked to film a meaningful corpus of material and to develop interactive computational structure to present the content.  Davenport taught the workshop for 10 years at the MIT Media Laboratory as well as in several international venues.  In 1989, the class created "The Elastic Charles," an interactive portrait of the Charles River.  The Elastic Charles combined historical, thematic, ecological and other perspectives on the Charles River. A time-lapse journey on the river provided one interactive structure. Using a hyper-link tool developed by Hans Peter Brondmo, viewers could define media segments and place them as video tags on the appropriate portion of time-lapse journey along the banks of the Charles.creating in effect a cinematic cut-away. One memorable video clip was an interview with Charlie, a worker at the Charles River Locks, who comments on the quality of the water at that time.  The Elastic Charles was an early exploration of how video and computers together can create a new narrative and documentary medium.

In Wheel of Life, Davenport collaborated with Stanford Professor Larry Friedlander on a large-scale computer-enhanced theater space and narrative piece, which has become a model for augmented interactive spaces.

Most her most recent "Arc of Change" project, Davenport collaborates with scientists, engineers, artists and restoration practitioners, to bring the sights, sounds and environmental data from an evolving fresh water restoration to the public. Collaborators at the Responsive Environments Group include Brian Mayton, Gershon Dublon, Spencer Russell, Donald Haddad and Joe Paradiso.

References

External links
 Publication List
 Glorianna Davenport's website
 Living Observatory

Living people
Mount Holyoke College alumni
MIT Media Lab people
Year of birth missing (living people)